The nadA RNA motif is a conserved RNA structure that was discovered by bioinformatics.
The nadA motif is found in Acidobacteriota.

nadA RNAs are usually located upstream of nadA genes, which encode quinolinate synthetase, an enzyme that performs a step in NAD synthesis.  However, two nadA RNAs are not upstream of a protein-coding gene.  Therefore, it is unclear whether nadA RNAs are likely to function as cis-regulatory elements or as small RNAs. These is also evidence that this motif acts as a riboswitch for the enzyme cofactor NAD+.

References

Non-coding RNA